In geometry, the cantic order-4 hexagonal tiling is a uniform tiling of the hyperbolic plane. It has Schläfli symbol of t0,1{(4,4,3)} or h2{6,4}.

Related polyhedra and tiling

References
 John H. Conway, Heidi Burgiel, Chaim Goodman-Strass, The Symmetries of Things 2008,  (Chapter 19, The Hyperbolic Archimedean Tessellations)

See also

Square tiling
Uniform tilings in hyperbolic plane
List of regular polytopes

External links 

 Hyperbolic and Spherical Tiling Gallery
 KaleidoTile 3: Educational software to create spherical, planar and hyperbolic tilings
 Hyperbolic Planar Tessellations, Don Hatch

Hexagonal tilings
Hyperbolic tilings
Isogonal tilings
Uniform tilings